Ambia schistochaeta is a moth in the family Crambidae. It was described by Tams in 1935. It is found on Samoa, Tutuila, and Pago Pago.

References

Musotiminae
Moths of Oceania
Fauna of American Samoa
Tutuila
Moths described in 1935